Heidi C. Von Gunden is a musicologist and Associate Professor of Composition-Theory at the University of Illinois Urbana-Champaign.  She has written books on the music of Ben Johnston, Pauline Oliveros, Lou Harrison, and Vivian Fine.  The books about Johnston's and Harrison's music are detailed studies about the composers' use of just intonation, and the books about Oliveros and Fine contain analyses of their music and examine the issues of women composers. In addition, Von Gunden has published several compositions and contributed theoretical writings and analyses to the College Music Symposium, Neuland, Perspectives of New Music, and the International League of Women Composers Journal.

References 

American music theorists
American women musicologists
Year of birth missing (living people)
Living people
Place of birth missing (living people)
Pupils of Pauline Oliveros
21st-century American women